
Year 381 BC was a year of the pre-Julian Roman calendar. At the time, it was known as the Year of the Tribunate of Camillus, Albinus, Albinus, Medullinus, Flavus and Ambustus (or, less frequently, year 373 Ab urbe condita). The denomination 381 BC for this year has been used since the early medieval period, when the Anno Domini calendar era became the prevalent method in Europe for naming years.

Events 
 By place 
 Persian Empire 
 The Persian generals Tiribazus and Orontes invade Cyprus, with an army far larger than any King Evagoras of Cyprus could raise. However, Evagoras manages to cut off this force from being resupplied, and the starving troops rebel. However, the war then turns in the Persians' favour when Evagoras' fleet is destroyed at the Battle of Citium (Larnaca, Cyprus). Evagoras flees to Salamis, where he manages to conclude a peace which allows him to remain nominally king of Salamis, though in reality he is a vassal of the Persian king.

 Greece 
 Sparta increases its hold on central Greece by reestablishing the city of Plataea, which Sparta formerly destroyed in 427 BC.

 Roman Republic 
 The district of Tusculum is pacified after a revolt against Rome, and then conquered. After an expression of complete submission to Rome, Tusculum becomes the first "municipium cum suffragio", and thenceforth the city continues to hold the rank of a municipium.

Births

Deaths 
 Wu Qi, Chinese military general, Prime Minister of the State of Chu, also a servant of the State of Lu (born in Wei, 440 BC)

References